The Iuhod is a right tributary of the river Târnava Mică in Romania. It discharges into the Târnava Mică near Sovata.

References

Rivers of Romania
Rivers of Mureș County
Rivers of Harghita County